Like a Hole in the Head is a 1970 thriller love story novel by British writer James Hadley Chase.

Plot summary
Ace marksman Jay Benson lives a retired life from the army with his beloved wife Lucy, and starts a school for training in firearm shooting. Unfortunately they fall short of money, when Augusto Savanto walks into their lives, promising Jay a huge sum of money in return for teaching his son Timoteo, who is totally uninterested in shooting. He wants his son to be able to shoot like an expert in just nine days. Benson agrees but soon realizes that he has entered a circle of revenge and murders involving mafias, in which he must participate, else it could affect both Lucy and him.

Film
The 1992 Russian film Sniper, which was filmed at Brezhnev's former dacha Wisteria built in 1955 as Gosdacha No. 1 in Nizhnyaya or Lower Oreanda on the southern coast of Crimea next to the Livadia Palace, is based upon Like a Hole in the Head.

Notes

References

External links
Like a Hole in the Head at Fantasticfiction.co.uk

1970 British novels
British thriller novels
Novels by James Hadley Chase
Robert Hale books